Peter Petrow (December 11, 1924 – April 22, 1997) was a Canadian football player who played for the Winnipeg Blue Bombers. He played football previously for the Manitoba Intermediate club.

References

1924 births
1997 deaths
Canadian football quarterbacks
Winnipeg Blue Bombers players
People from Saint Boniface, Winnipeg
Players of Canadian football from Manitoba
Canadian football people from Winnipeg